Virginie Norbertina Maria Korte-van Hemel (8 May 1929 – 3 April 2014) was a Dutch politician of the defunct Catholic People's Party (KVP) now merged into the Christian Democratic Appeal (CDA) party and jurist.

Korte-van Hemel worked as student researcher at the Utrecht University from June 1953 until July 1955 and as a lawyer and prosecutor in Bussum from August 1955 until September 1977. Korte-van Hemel served on the Municipal Council of Bussum from April 1966 until September 1977 and served as an Alderperson in Bussum from September 1970 until September 1974. Korte-van Hemel became a Member of the House of Representatives after Fons van der Stee was appointed as Minister of Agriculture and Fisheries and Minister for Netherlands Antilles Affairs in the Cabinet Van Agt-Wiegel following the election of 1977, serving from 15 September 1977 until 10 June 1981. Korte-van Hemel returned as a Member of the House of Representatives after Job de Ruiter was appointed as Minister of Justice in the Cabinet Van Agt II following the election of 1981, serving from 9 September 1981 until 16 September 1982. After the election of 1982 Korte-van Hemel was appointed as State Secretary for Justice in the Cabinet Lubbers I, taking office on 8 November 1982. After the election of 1982 Korte-van Hemel returned as a Member of the House of Representatives, taking office on 3 June 1986. After the cabinet formation of 1986 Korte-van Hemel continued as State Secretary for Justice in the Cabinet Lubbers II, taking office on 14 July 1986. In February 1989 Korte-van Hemel announced that he would not stand for the election of 1989. Following the cabinet formation of 1989 Korte-van Hemel was not giving a cabinet post in the new cabinet, the Cabinet Lubbers II was replaced by the Cabinet Lubbers III on 7 November 1989.

Korte-van Hemel remained in active politics, she elected as a Member of the Senate after the Senate election of 1991, taking office on 11 June 1991. In October 1992 Korte-van Hemel was nominated as an Extraordinary Member of the Council of State, she resigned as a Member of the Senate the day she was installed as an Extraordinary Member of the Council of State, serving from 1 November 1992 until 1 June 1999.

Decorations

References

External links

  Mr. V.N.M. (Virginie) Korte-van Hemel Parlement & Politiek
  Mr. V.N.M. Korte-Van Hemel (CDA) Eerste Kamer der Staten-Generaal

 

1929 births
2014 deaths
Aldermen in North Holland
Catholic People's Party politicians
Christian Democratic Appeal politicians
Commanders of the Order of Orange-Nassau
Dutch nonprofit directors
Dutch prosecutors
Dutch Roman Catholics
Dutch women jurists
Dutch women lawyers
Knights of the Holy Sepulchre
Members of the Council of State (Netherlands)
Members of the House of Representatives (Netherlands)
Members of the Senate (Netherlands)
Municipal councillors in North Holland
Officers of the Order of Leopold II
People from Bergen op Zoom
People from Bussum
State Secretaries for Justice of the Netherlands
Utrecht University alumni
Academic staff of Utrecht University
Women government ministers of the Netherlands
20th-century Dutch jurists
20th-century Dutch lawyers
20th-century Dutch women politicians
20th-century Dutch politicians
21st-century Dutch jurists
20th-century women lawyers